Hongik University (colloquially Hongdae) is a private university in Seoul, South Korea. Founded by an activist in 1946, the university is located in Mapo-gu district of central Seoul, South Korea with a second campus(branch campus) in Sejong. In addition, Hongik University(Seoul campus) is universities in Korea.

Hongik University has a bachelor's degree in art(paint & drawing) in South Korea. However, the university also offers a range of undergraduate and graduate programs. As of 2007, the university was home to 14,500 undergraduate students and 2,600 graduate students, and the undergraduate school consists of College of Fine Arts, College of Education, College of Engineering, College of Liberal Arts, College of Architecture, College of Law, and College of Economics and Business Administration. The graduate school provides research-based and practice-based programs in comprehensive fields including liberal arts, engineering, fine arts and design, education, economics, performing arts, urban planning, architecture, film and photography. The shortened term for Hongik University, "Hongdae," serves as a metonym for the neighborhood.

History
The university was established shortly after Korean independence. The Daejongkyo founders, upon returning to Korea following Japanese surrender after years of exile in China, prioritized the establishment of an educational institution. As a result, in 1946, they founded the school, then named Hongmoon-daehakgwan (홍문대학관). Lee Hung Soo, a wealthy Korean independent activist, donated the initial funds from which the university found its beginnings. In August 1948, Hongik University and Hongik Foundation was approved officially by the Korean government.

By 1950, the school had expanded steadily to accommodate departments in law, liberal arts, political science, and science. The school was forced to move to Daejeon and Busan during the Korean War. Upon its return to Seoul in 1953, the university continued its growth. In Seoul, the university continued to expand academic programs, including departments of business and economics, education, engineering, fine arts, handicrafts, as well as a Graduate School. The foundation established Hongik Junior Technical College, Hongik Junior and Senior High Schools, Hongik Girls' Junior and Senior High Schools, and Hongik Elementary School. In 1971, Hongik College attained a new status, merging with Soo-Do Engineering College to form Hongik University, with twenty departments in the College of Business and Economics, Engineering, and Fine Arts. It was also in 1971 that the Graduate School of Industrial Arts came into being. Evening classes and the College of Education were added in 1972 and 1973, respectively. In 1981–82, the Ministry of Education authorized the establishment of the College of Liberal Arts, the Graduate School of Environmental Studies, and the Graduate School of Education.

In keeping pace with the growing student enrollment, a program of physical expansion was pursued. The Liberal Arts Building and the Computer Center were completed in 1983 and 1985, respectively, and the construction of the Gymnasium was completed at the end of 1985. Also, two student dormitories were constructed: the first one, a six-story building of 122 square meters, was built in 1988, and the other, a six-story building of 263 square meters with two underground floors, was built in 1989. In the same year, the auditorium, which had been damaged by a fire, was remodeled, resulting in a three-story building of 282 square meters. 1989 also saw the opening of a second campus at Sejong formerly known as  Jochiwon, Chungcheongnam-do.

On April 23, 1988, the first phase of construction, including the lecture buildings, gymnasium, auditorium, and dormitories started. Also, sports facilities for baseball, soccer, and tennis were added. All these efforts culminated into 11 buildings as of March 1991. Further expansion took place from 1991 to 1994, with more departments and colleges being added to the university.

The years 1986 through 1988 marked a period of further expansion in Hongik's educational programs. The Graduate School of International Business Administration and the College of Law & Economics were established. The Department of Art Science, the Department of Printmaking, and the Department of Visual Design were added to the College of Fine Arts. In addition, the Institute of Fine Arts & Design Education was set up to provide continuing education for adults.

In keeping pace with the growing student enrollment, a program of physical expansion was pursued. The Liberal Arts Building and the Computer Center were completed in 1983 and 1985, respectively, and the construction of the Gymnasium was completed at the end of 1985. Also, two student dormitories were constructed: the first one, a six-story building of 122 square meters, was built in 1988, and the other, a six-story building of 263 square meters with two underground floors, was built in 1989. In the same year, the auditorium, which had been damaged by a fire, was remodeled, resulting in a three-story building of 282 square meters.

In 1989, the College of Industrial Sciences, with eleven departments, was established at the second campus in Sejong. The preparation for the second campus was initiated by the purchase of a plot of land covering 151,250 square meters in Sejong. On April 23, 1988, the first phase of construction, including the lecture buildings, gymnasium, auditorium, and dormitories started. Also, sports facilities for baseball, soccer, and tennis were added. All these efforts culminated into 11 buildings as of March 1991.

Further expansion took place from 1991 to 1994, with more departments and colleges being added to the university. The Department of Radio Science & Communication Engineering was established in the College of Engineering at the Seoul campus. The College of Industrial Sciences at the second campus was divided into the College of Science and Technology and the College of Visual Arts (now renamed the College of Design and Arts), where the latter included the Department of Industrial Crafts and the Department of Advertisement Design. The College of Business Management was also added during this period.

In 1995 and 1996, Hongik University underwent a major restructuring of the departments of the colleges. Many departments exploring similar fields of study were merged into school systems, thereby allowing students to explore a wider spectrum. Additionally, three more graduate schools were established: the Graduate School of Industry at theSejong campus and the Graduate School of Advertising and Public Relations and the Graduate School of Educational Management at the Seoul campus. Also, in 1995, the university began to expand globally, becoming sister universities with over 32 institutions worldwide, including those in the United States, China, Russia, Japan, the United Kingdom, Spain, Finland, and Australia, among others.

The Hongik International Language Institute was established in 1997 to further support foreign language studies, vital in this age of globalization. The School of Advertising and Public Relations, the first of its kind in Korea, opened in 1998.

The creation of the Gangnam Art Center in 1999 and the establishment of the Daehakro Campus in Hyewha, the most frequented gathering place for youngsters, in 2002, were efforts to establish a system of lifelong education within Hongik University. There were other major happenings in 2002 as well: the Gyeonseong School Foundation was merged with the Hongik Foundation; a new campus was opened in Suwon, which is a city just adjacent to the south of Seoul; in Mallipo, which is on the west coast, the Beach Training Center opened. In 2004, the Graduate School of Film & Design Media and the International Design school for Advanced Studies (IDAS) were established.

The Department of Radio Science & Communication Engineering was established in the College of Engineering at the Seoul campus. The College of Industrial Sciences at the second campus was divided into the College of Science and Technology and the College of Visual Arts (now renamed the College of Design and Arts), where the latter included the Department of Industrial Crafts and the Department of Advertisement Design. The College of Business Management was added during this period.

Campuses

The main campus of the school is in west central Seoul, and the second in Sejong.

Seoul campus
Since 1955, Hongik University's main campus is located in Mapo District, Seoul.

   Hongik University station
 Sangsu station

Some facilities, including International Design school for Advanced Studies, are located in Daehangno, Jongno District, Seoul.

Sejong campus

Opened in 1987, the second campus is located in Sejong City.

Colleges and Schools
Source:

Undergraduate
 College of Fine Arts
 Department of Oriental Painting
 Department of Painting
 Department of Printmaking
 Department of Sculpture
 Department of Woodworking and Furniture Design
 Department of Art Theory and History
 Department of Metal Art and Design
 Department of Ceramics and Glass
 Department of Textile Art and Fashion Design
 School of Design
 Major in Visual Communication Design  
 Major in Industrial Design  
 College of Liberal Arts
 Department of Korean Language and Literature
 Department of German Language and Literature
 Department of French Language and Literature
 Department of English Language and Literature
 College of Engineering
 Department of Civil and Environmental Engineering
 Department of Mechanical & System Design Engineering
 School of Electronic & Electrical Engineering
 School of Chemical Engineering & Materials Science
 Major in Materials Science & Engineering  
 Major in Chemical Engineering  
 Department of Industrial and Data Engineering
 Department of Computer Engineering
 College of Architecture and Urban Planning
 School of Architecture
 Major in Architecture  
 Major in Interior Architecture  
 Department of Urban Design and Planning
 College of Business Administration
 School of Business Administration
 College of Law
 School of Law
 College of Education
 Department of Education
 Department of Korean Language Education
 Department of Mathematics Education
 Department of History Education
 Department of English Language Education
 College of Science and Technology
 School of Architecture Engineering
 Major in Architecture Design  
 Major in Architecture Engineering  
 Department of Mechanical & Design Engineering
 Department of Biological & Chemical Engineering
 Department of Electronic & Electrical Convergence Engineering
 Department of Nanomaterial Engineering
 Department of Naval Architecture & Ocean Engineering
 Department of Software & Communication Engineering
 College of Business Management
 School of Business Management
 Major in International Management  
 Major in Accounting  
 Major in Finance & Insurance  
 College of Design Arts
 School of Design Convergence
 School of Film & Animation
 School of Performing Arts
 Major in Musical Theatre
 Major in Contemporary Music
 School of Economics
 School of Design Management
 School of Liberal Studies
 School of Advertising and Public Relations
 School of Games
 Major in Game Software
 Major in Game Graphic Design
 Department of Sports Science

Postgraduate
 International Design school for Advanced Studies
 Graduate School of Architecture and Urban Design
 Graduate School of Business
 Graduate School of Education
 Graduate School of Fine Arts
 Graduate School of Performing Arts
 Graduate School of Culture, Information and Public Policy
 Graduate School of Industrial Arts
 Graduate School of Film, Digital Media and Communication
 Graduate School of Arts and Cultural Management
 Graduate School of Fashion
 Graduate School of Smart Urban Science Management

Hongdae area

The neighborhood of the Seoul campus has been renowned for Korean indie music and art culture since the 1980s. Until the 2000s, the district remained as an original indie hipster area for young adults, however, due to the incursion and expansion of corporate brands and real estate development, gentrification has become a serious issue for many years. As an outcome, the neighborhood has also expanded to adjacent areas. It is a very crowded and commercial district full of young adults mostly who would like to enjoy hip restaurants, bars, live and night clubs, and art galleries including alternative art spaces.

Notable alumni

 Ham Tae-ho, (Economics) Founder of Ottogi/ Honorary Chairman
 Koh Jung-wook, (Economics): CEO of Lotte Capital.
 Jeom-Joo Kwon, (Business Administration): Former President of Shinhan Life Insurance.
 Dongmin Kim, CEO of JLK Inspection.
 Youngchan Kim, (Mechanical Engineering): President of Golfzon.
 Seongam Kim, (Electronic Engineering): President of Korea Electric Power Technology.
 Kim Jong-deok, (Visual Design): Former Dean of Hongik University's Graduate School of Visual Arts. 48th Minister of Culture, Sports and Tourism. That person at Choi Soon-sil Gate is correct.
 Taegon Kim, (Electronic and Electrical Engineering): Managing Director, Endors. Im Jinrok, Colossus, Monarch Online development.
 Yong-deuk Ma, (Mechanical Engineering): Former CEO of Lotte Information and Communication.
 Dae-Jun Park, (Business Administration): CEO of Coupang.
 Yongseon Park, (Business Administration): CEO of Woongjin Coway.
 Kwang-Yoon Byun, (Mechanical Engineering): President of eBay Korea.
 Seo Dong-gu, (News and Broadcasting): Skylife CEO, former KBS president.
 Hyewon Son, (Applied Art): 20th National Assembly member, Director of the Najeon Lacquerware Museum in Korea, Representative of Crosspoint International.
 Youngkwan Lee, (Chemical Engineering): Chairman of Toray Advanced Materials.
 Youngho Lee, (Mathematics Education): CEO of Chu Life Life Insurance.
 Eunjung Lee, (Business Administration): CEO of Mcnulty Korea.
 Jun-seop Lee, (Industrial Engineering): The 10th National Assembly member of the Democratic Republic of Korea.
 Lee Cheon-deuk, (Painting): Former Vice President of Samchully Group.
 Hanwoo Lee, (Business Administration): CEO of Kyobo Books.
 Jae-Yeop Choo, (Electrical Engineering): Former Mayor of Yangcheon-gu, Seoul.
 Byung-ki Han, (Economics): The 8th member of the Democratic Republican Party. Park Jeong-hee's eldest son-in-law and Park Geun-hye's half-brother.
 Yuno Hwang, (Business Administration): President of Hyundai Card, Hyundai Capital, and Hyundai Commercial.
 Myeong-Kwang Kwon, (College of Fine Arts): Professor of Hongik University, 15th President of Hongik University.
 Sa-Hyang Kim, (English Education): Professor, Department of English Education, Hongik University.
 Kim Soo-hyang, (German German Literature): Professor of Aviation Services, a flight attendant in charge of the presidential plane of the Republic of Korea and the private plane of the prime minister.
 Jong-Min Kim, (Electronic Engineering): The first Korean professor at Oxford University.
 Sang-Woo Seo, (Architecture): Professor Emeritus of Architecture, Kookmin University.
 Joo-Seok Shim,  (Mathematics Education): Instructor for EBSi Mathematics 1 stroke.
 Sunyeol Yang, (Korean Language and Literature): Mega Public Official (Mega Study Education) PSAT Language Logic Instructor. Mensa Korea Thinking Training Author.
 Jang-Gyu Lee, (Architecture): Math instructor at Etus.
 Ja-eun Yu, (Metal Material Engineering): Chairman of Konkuk University.
 Da-bi Choi, (French and French Literature): Professor, Department of Culture and Arts Management, Dongduk Women's University.
 Kyung-Yong Hyun, (Painting): A suspect in a leaked test paper from Sookmyung Girls' High School. Former head of school affairs at Sookmyung Girls' High School.
 Choi Won-young, actor
 Jo Han-sun, actor
 Kang Eui-sik, actor
 Kim Sung-kyung, actress
 Ko Eun-ah, actress
 Ko Young-hoon, painter
 Kwon Oh-joong, actor
 GRAY, rapper and producer from AOMG
 Maia Ruth Lee, artist
 Loco, rapper from AOMG
 Oh Hyuk, musician from Hyukoh
 Woo Won-jae, rapper from AOMG
 Lee Bul, artist
 Kimsooja, artist
 Park Seo-bo, artist
 Han Yujoo, writer
 Kim Yong-ik, artist
 Kim Hong-hee, art historian, curator
 Chan-Jin Chung, professor & founder of Robofest
Lee Uk-bae, writer and illustrator of children's books
Ha Chong-hyun, artist
Park Hyun-ki, artist

Affiliated schools 
 Hongik University High School
 Hongik University Girls' High School
 Gyeongseong High School
 Seoul Hongik Design High School
 Hwaseong Hongik Design High School
 Hongik University Middle School
 Hongik University Girls' Middle School
 Gyeongseong Middle School
 Hongik Elementary School

See also

List of colleges and universities in South Korea
Education in South Korea
Hongdae, Seoul

References

External links
  Official website
  Official website
 
 International Design school for Advanced Studies

 
Universities and colleges in Seoul
Universities and colleges in Sejong City
Educational institutions established in 1946
1946 establishments in South Korea
Universities established in the 1940s
Private universities and colleges in South Korea
Mapo District